Pornography in India is available in print magazines, but is mainly consumed using the internet. This consumption is increasing with the increased prevalence of smartphones and the internet. Despite the increased access, public discourse and attitudes on pornography remain muted and a taboo in many parts of India. Publishing pornographic material is illegal in India.

Types of publication

Print
Studies have found that print media is less widely accessible than internet media in India. A randomized survey of 96 random vendors, such as video stores, mobile downloads/recharge stores and cybercafés, in Haryana, India found that 17% displayed pornography openly, 34% displayed it semi-openly, and 49% kept it hidden. It is possible that cultural taboos and legal issues (such as those described below) make it more desirable to view pornography in India through internet mediums, such as computers or smartphones, for more privacy.

Internet 

Internet pornography has become very popular in India with from 30% up to 70% of total traffic from porn websites. It has become a major portion of traffic and source of data revenue for telecom companies. A popular porn site released viewership data and national capital Delhi recorded up to 40% of all traffic.

One self reporting survey found that 63% of youths in urban areas such as Haryana reported watching pornography, with 74% accessing it through their mobile phones. As smartphone and internet access in India continues to increase, more people will be able to privately view pornography. Quartz has found that 50% of Indian IP addresses accessed popular pornography websites on mobile phones. Online erotic comics have also become popular in India as the internet becomes more readily available to the common citizen.

Legality 
 The selling and distribution of pornographic material is illegal in India under section 292.
 The distribution, sale, or circulation of obscene materials and the selling of pornographic content to any person under age 20 years are illegal under section 293 and IT Act-67B.
 Child pornography is illegal and strictly prohibited across the country under section 67B of the Information Technology Act, 2000 
 The manufacturing, publishing and distribution of pornography is illegal in India under section 292, 293.

In July 2015 the Supreme Court of India refused to allow the blocking of pornographic websites and said that watching pornography indoors in the privacy of one's own home was not a crime. In August 2015 the Government of India issued an order to Indian ISPs to block at least 857 websites that it considered to be pornographic. In 2015 the Department of Telecommunications (DoT) had asked internet service providers to take down 857 websites in a bid to control cyber crime, but after receiving criticism from the authorities it partially rescinded the ban. The ban from the government came after a lawyer filed a petition in the Supreme Court arguing that online pornography  encourages sex crimes and rapes.

In February 2016 the Supreme Court asked the Indian Government to suggest ways of banning all forms of child pornography.

In October 2018 the government directed Internet service providers to block 827 websites that host pornographic content following an order by the Uttarakhand High Court. The court cited the rape of a 10th standard girl from Dehradun by four of her seniors. The four accused told police that they raped the girl after watching pornography on the Internet.

Judicial opinion 
The Supreme Court of India, in Khoday Distilleries Ltd. and Ors. v. State of Karnataka and Ors. - (1995) 1 SCC 574, held that there is no fundamental right to carry on business of exhibiting and publishing pornographic or obscene films and literature.

Kamlesh Vaswani vs. Union of India and ors in 2013 (diary 5917, 2013), a PIL petition was filed in the Supreme Court of India seeking a ban on pornography in India. The Court issued a notice to the central government of India and sought its response. The government informed the Court that the Cyber Regulation Advisory Committee constituted under Section 88 of the IT Act, 2000 was assigned with a brief with regard to availability of pornography on the Internet and it was looking into the matter.

On 26 January 2016, the Supreme Court in written order, instructed govt "to suggest the ways and means so that these activities are curbed. The innocent children cannot be made prey to these kind of painful situations, and a nation, by no means, can afford to carry any kind of experiment with its children in the name of liberty and freedom of expression. When we say nation, we mean each member of the collective".

Prajwala Letter dated 18.2.2015 VIDEOS OF SEXUAL VIOLENCE AND RECOMMENDATIONS, a suo moto PIL was admitted in Supreme Court (Diary No.- 6818 - 2015). Prajwala NGO pleaded to court to stop rampant circulation of rape videos through mobile application WhatsApp. Supreme court has ordered CBI probe to find and arrest the culprits clearly visible in the rape videos.

Socio-cultural attitudes 
Many sex related topics, such as pornography, are considered taboo in traditional Indian households. This trend seems to be rapidly changing, especially in urbanized cities. Researchers have found that the primary sex education of youth born in the 1990s onwards in India comes from pornography and conversations amongst their peers, which has been known to cause long term sexual anxiety and frustration in other cultures where youth learn sexual attitudes from pornography. However, due to the internet and increased access for the common citizen, pornography has slowly entered the public discourse, most notably with the outrage towards a 2015 government order to censor 857 websites that contained explicit materials.

Homosexual pornography
Homosexual pornography is not widely available in print, due to the socio-culture taboo surrounding both pornography and homosexuality (see LGBT culture in India). However, Indian IP addresses access both lesbian and gay porn using the internet, with a 213% increase in searches for gay porn from 2013 to 2014. Additionally, the most popular search for pornography amongst females in India, centers on lesbian and gay pornography.

Violence 
Important people in media have argued that censoring pornography would decrease rapes in India. There has not been a link between pornography being a significant factor in the rate of crime and violence in India. On the contrary, in other countries, increased availability of porn has been correlated with lower rates of sexual violence.

Sex work 
Some studies have speculated that pornography influences sex work in India. For instance, one study of 555 female sex workers found that 45% self-reported pornographic influence driving clientele desire for anal sex. In another study, female sex workers reported being asked to perform new sexual acts such as anal sex, masturbation and different sex positions, requests that they believed were due to an increased exposure to pornography. The implications of such work is currently unclear for public health policy in India.

See also
 
 Pornography laws by region
 Legality of child pornography
 Internet censorship in India
 Sex in Indian entertainment
 Sexuality in India
 Pornography laws by region 
 Pornography in Asia
 Pornography in Europe
 Pornography in the United States
 Ullu
 Debonair (magazine)
 Kirtu
 Savita Bhabhi
 Savita Bhabhi (film)

References

Bibliography  
 
  
  
 Sharma MK, Rao GN, Benegal V, Thennarasu K, Oommen D. Use of pornography in India: Need to explore its implications. The National Medical Journal of India (2019); 32:282-284   
 
   
 Datta, S., Panda, R., & Das, S. (2017). Need for Personal Space: Legalizing Pornography in India. Media Watch, 8(3), 355-365. 
 Vinnakota, Divya, S. M. Yasir Arafat, Sujita Kumar Kar, Madhini Sivasubramanian, Sayeda Razia Hossain, Ali Davod Parsa, and Russell Kabir. “Pornography and Sexual Violence Against Women in India: A Scoping Review.” Journal of Psychosexual Health 3, no. 3 (July 2021): 216–21.  
   
 
 Mahapatra B, Saggurti N. Exposure to pornographic videos and its effect on HIV-related sexual risk behaviours among male migrant workers in southern India. PLoS One. 2014 Nov 25;9(11):e113599. . ; .
 Bradley, J., Rajaram, S.P., Isac, S. et al. Pornography, Sexual Enhancement Products, and Sexual Risk of Female Sex Workers and their Clients in Southern India. Archives of Sexual Behavior 45, 945–954 (2016).  
 
  
 
 
 
 Math SB, Viswanath B, Maroky AS, Kumar NC, Cherian AV, Nirmala MC. Sexual Crime in India: Is it Influenced by Pornography? Indian J Psychol Med. 2014 Apr;36(2):147-52. . ; .

External links
 India Code Legislative Department

 

 
Discrimination in India
Law of India
Sex laws
Obscenity controversies
Freedom of speech in India
Sexuality in India